Night of the Bloody Apes is the title of the 1972 English language version of the 1969 Mexican horror film La Horripilante bestia humana ("The Horrible Man-Beast"), also known as Horror y sexo ("Horror and Sex") and as Gomar—The Human Gorilla. The film was directed by René Cardona and is a remake of his 1962 film Las Luchadoras contra el medico asesino ("The Wrestling Women vs. the Killer Doctor"; U.S. title Doctor of Doom), the first in a series of films blending elements of the lucha libre and horror genres.

Plot
Mad scientist Dr. Krellman attempts to cure his son's leukemia by doing a heart transplant, replacing his son's heart with a gorilla's. The result of the operation transforms Krellman's son into a deformed and mutated man-ape hybrid taking on the characteristics of the organ's donor, who immediately goes on a bloody rampage.

Differences with Doctor of Doom 
Both films' plots concern a mad scientist who transplants a gorilla's heart into his dying son, saving his life but transforming him into a monstrous, ape-like creature who embarks on a rape and murder spree. But the plot of Night of the Bloody Apes does not have the character of the female wrestler bringing the ape-man to justice — rather, she has a much less pronounced role in the plot.

Cast
 José Elías Moreno as Dr. Krallman
 Carlos López Moctezuma as Goyo
 Armando Silvestre as Lt. Arturo Martinez
 Norma Lazareno as Lucy Osorio
 Agustín Martínez Solares as Julio Krallman
 Gerardo Zepeda as Monster

Production 
Rene Cardona directed the film in 1968 and coauthored the script with his son Rene Cardona Jr.

Release
The film was theatrically released in Mexico in 1969, and in 1972 in the United States. The Italian theatrical poster credits the director under the name of Richard Green. Because of its scenes of rape and violence, the film has been rated C in Mexico, R in Australia and the United States; in the United Kingdom it was rated X before being banned until 1999 and then restricted again to audiences over 18.

Home media
The film was released on DVD by Film 2000 on July 22, 2002. On April 1 that same year, it was released by Image Entertainment as part of the 4-disc Beauties & Beasts box set. In 2006, it was released twice by BCI as part of a multi-disc set on August 8 and 22. On March 26, 2007, it was released by Redemption. BCI re-released the film on March 4, 2008 as part of the 4-disc Crypt of Terror: Horror from South of the Border movie pack. It was last released by VCI Video on July 15, 2014.

Reception
In a contemporary review, the Monthly Film Bulletin noted that the film "tries to wring some more mileage out of the bizarre but shopworn Mexican device of casting monsters and wrestlers as sparring partners", and that it was brought down by its "stately pace, the endless expressions of paternal devotion, and the script's risible attempts to offer medical explanation and justifications". On a positive note, the review said that the film was "enhanced by Cardona's habit of highlighting dramatic moments by dropping in the odd expressionistically-tinged shot with cavalier disregard for matching photographic textures". TV Guide panned the film, calling it "[a] gross, unbelievably inept offering". Graeme Clark from The Spinning Image gave the film 5 out of 10 stars, writing, "As a curio it is worth seeing, but only for its regular incidents of ridiculousness". Reviewing BCI's double feature release of the film, Ian Jane of DVD Talk gave the film a positive review, calling it "one of the best known Mexican horror films of the era". Concluding his review, Jane wrote, "A completely bizarre mish-mash of wrestling, gore, bad monster make up and mad scientist fun, Night of the Bloody Apes is a blast from start to finish. The effects are shoddy and as fake as fake can be and the make up looks like something out of a high school play but that's all part of the film's low budget charm". Dennis Schwartz from Ozus' World Movie Reviews gave the film a C grade, calling it "inept". Jonathan Rosenbaum of Chicago Reader gave the film a negative review, writing, "Even the tolerant Psychotronic Encyclopedia of Film deems this 'totally tasteless and amateurish,' but gore buffs should be alerted to real open-heart surgery footage."

References

External links

 
 
 
 

1972 films
1972 horror films
Mexican thriller films
Mad scientist films
Mexican science fiction films
1970s monster movies
Mexican monster movies
Splatter films
1970s Mexican films
1960s Mexican films